The Embassy of Luxembourg in Washington, D.C. is the diplomatic mission of the Grand Duchy of Luxembourg to the United States. It is located in an ornate manor at 2200 Massachusetts Avenue, NW on Embassy Row.

The embassy also serves as Luxembourg's mission to Canada and Mexico.
The current ambassador is Nicole Bintner-Bakshian.

Building
The building was originally constructed for lumber baron and former Congressman Alexander Stewart in 1909.  It was designed by Jules Henri de Sibour and built in the French style of Louis XIV.  Stewart died in 1912 and his widow lived in the building until her death in 1931.  In 1941, her daughter sold it to Grand Duchess Charlotte of Luxembourg who was then in exile due to the German occupation of her country in the Second World War.  It was bought by the government of Luxembourg in 1962 and has been home to the embassy ever since.  The building was refurbished and renovated in 2003.

See also
 List of ambassadors from Luxembourg to the United States
 List of diplomatic missions of Luxembourg
 List of diplomatic missions in Washington, D.C.

References

External links

Embassy of Luxembourg in Washington, D.C.
"Several New, Renovated Chanceries to Debut in Active Building Season", The Washington Diplomat (December 2003)

Luxembourg
Washington
Luxembourg–United States relations
Luxembourg–Mexico relations
Canada–Luxembourg relations
Luxembourg
Houses completed in 1909
Baroque Revival architecture